Tjitske Geertruida Maria van Hettinga Tromp (1872-1962) was a Dutch painter.

Biography
Hettinga Tromp was born on 11 April 1872 in Groningen. She studied at the Akademie van beeldende kunsten (Den Haag) (Royal Academy of Art, The Hague). She studied with Henk Bremmer. She was a member of the Pulchri Studio. In 1932 she traveled to Selva, Mallorca with fellow artist Jo Koster. Hettinga Tromp's work was included in the 1939 exhibition and sale Onze Kunst van Heden (Our Art of Today) at the Rijksmuseum in Amsterdam.

Hettinga Tromp died on 22 February 1962 in Zwolle.

References

External links
images of Hettinga Tromp's art on ArtNet

1872 births
1962 deaths
Dutch women artists